Mitu  is a genus of curassows, large birds in the family Cracidae. They are found in humid tropical forests in South America. Their plumage is iridescent black with a white or rufous crissum (the area around the cloaca) and tail-tip, and their legs and bills are red. The genders are alike.

Species

References

 
Curassows
Bird genera
Taxa named by René Lesson